Hossein Sadjadi Ghaemmaghami Farahani, better known by his pen name Kader Abdolah (Arak, 12 November 1954), is an Iranian-Dutch writer, poet and columnist. His books, written in Dutch, often contain Persian literary themes. He regularly appears on Dutch TV as well.

Life 
Kader Abdolah is one of the descendants of Mirza Abu'l-Qasem Qa'em-Maqam, the Iranian politician during the Qajar period who was also affiliated with art and literature.

Kader Abdolah had long wished to become an author. He used his political passion to begin his career after the Islamic revolution in 1979 by writing articles in the leftist political newspapers.

In the 1980s, he wrote two novels which were published illegally because of the political constraints: What are the Kurds saying? and Kurdistan after the resistance party.

When he immigrated to the Netherlands, he felt as if political issues were no longer relevant to his life and he fell into a state of depression because he had thought of political activities as the essence of his life. Learning Dutch and to write in the language is therefore described by him as a political tool for fighting. Literature had turned into the incentive for a new fight.

Career
Kader Abdolah studied physics in Arak College of Science (today's Arak university) in Arak, Iran and graduated in 1977. After graduation he served his mandatory military service at Iranian Navy in Bandar Pahlavi (today's Bandar-e-Anzali) During the revolution he joined the left-wing movement opposing the Shah – and later the Khomeini – regimes. He fled to the Netherlands as a political refugee in 1988. In 2006 he was writer in residence at Leiden University. Today he lives in Delft, writing under a pseudonym composed of the names of two executed friends.

Het huis van de moskee (The House of the Mosque) catapulted Abdolah onto the Dutch bestseller lists. In 2007 it was voted second best Dutch novel ever in the Netherlands in an online survey organized by NRC Handelsblad and NPS. The English translation was released worldwide in January 2010.

Works/Publications
 1993 – De adelaars
 1995 – De meisjes en de partizanen
 1997 – De reis van de lege flessen
 1998 – Is dit mijn recht, mijn lief?
 1998 – Buitenspiegels: verhalen over Nederland
 1998 – Mirza
 1998 – Short Shorties
 
 1999 – Les jeunes filles et les partisans
 2000 – Spijkerschrift (English trans.2006 "My Father's Notebook") 
 2001 – De koffer
  
 2001 – Een tuin in zee
  
 2001 – Andere ogen: Een frisse blik op
 2002 – Kélilé en Demné
 2002 – Sophia's droë vrugte
 2003 – Portretten en een oude droom
 2003 – Karavaan
 2005 - Het huis van de moskee (The House of the Mosque)
 2006 – II viaggio delle botiglie vuote
  
 2007 – Voetstappen
 2008 – De boodschapper: een vertelling / de Koran: een vertaling. A two volume set: De boodschapper: een vertelling ('The Messenger: a narration') about the life of the prophet Mohammed, and de Koran: een vertaling ('The Qur'an: a translation'), Abdolah's Dutch translation of the Qur'an
 2008 – Das Haus an der Moschee
 
 2010 – Mohammad, der Prophet
 
 
 2011 – De koning
 2011 – De kraai
 2012 – IL re
 2012 – How Europe is changing 
  
 2014 – Papegaai vloog over de IJssel
 2014 – The King
 2016 – Messenger, The: A Tale Retold
 2016 – Salam Europa!
 
  
 2016 – Qur'an the 
 2018 – Het pad van de gele slippers
  
 
 2020 – The House of the Mosque

Honours and awards
 Best selling debut of 1993 for his book De adelaars(Eagles).
 Dutch Media Prize, 1997 for his book Mirza
 E. du Perronprijs of 2000 for his novel Spijkerschrift.
 Knight in the Order of the Netherlands Lion (Dutch: Ridder in de Orde van de Nederlandse Leeuw) in 2000.
 Knight in the French Order of Arts and Literature (French: Chevalier dans l'Ordre des Arts et des Lettres) in 2008.
 Honorary doctor at the University of Groningen in 2009.
 Invitation to write the 2011 , a gift (De Kraai) to buyers of Dutch books during the Boekenweek.

References

External links

 Kader Abdolah at UC Berkeley: Literature as Resistance: Role of Clandestine Literature in Dictatorships like Iran
 Kader Abdolah's brief background at World Editions.org
 Contributor: Kader Abdolah at Words Without Borders
 
 
 
 Books by Kader Abdolah and Complete Book Reviews at Publishers Weekly

1954 births
Living people
People from Arak, Iran
People from Markazi Province
Iranian writers
Iranian emigrants to the Netherlands
20th-century Dutch writers
21st-century Dutch writers